Apostolepis underwoodi is a species of snake in the family Colubridae. It is endemic to Bolivia.

References 

underwoodi
Reptiles described in 2017
Reptiles of Bolivia